City Club is the fifth studio album by the Southern California rock band The Growlers, released on 30 September 2016 by Cult Records.

Track listing 
All songs by Brooks Nielsen and Matt Taylor, except "Night Ride" (Kyle Mullarky/Nielsen/Taylor) and "Blood of a Mutt" (Mullarky/Nielsen).
Other Outtakes

Critical reception 

City Club received mixed to positive reviews from contemporary music critics.  At Metacritic, which assigns a normalized rating out of 100 to reviews from mainstream publications, the album received an average score of 64, based on six reviews, indicating "generally favorable reviews". In a mixed review, Jack Doherty, writing for Drowned in Sound, criticized the sound of the band, saying it was outdated. Doherty said "on the whole City Club is full of the type of synth funk nonsense that should have been left alone in the late Noughties." Shannon Cotton, writing for Clash, gave a more endearing review. Cotton said the album had  "a distinct retro vibe. Most of the tracks possess a nostalgic groove which wouldn’t render them out of place in an episode of the enigmatic Twin Peaks". In a mixed review, Christopher Monger, writing for AllMusic, said the album might attract new fans, but alienate long time fans, saying the album "may not be what fans were expecting, but it's by far the Growlers' most immediate and accessible collection of songs to date."

Charts

References 

2016 albums
The Growlers albums
Post-punk albums by American artists